The 2018 Big 12 Conference women's basketball tournament was the postseason women's basketball tournament for the Big 12 Conference, held March 2–5 in Oklahoma City at Chesapeake Energy Arena.

Seeds

Schedule

Bracket
Source:
 All times are Central

All-Tournament team
Most Outstanding Player – Kalani Brown, Baylor

See also
2018 Big 12 Conference men's basketball tournament
2018 NCAA Women's Division I Basketball Tournament
2017–18 NCAA Division I women's basketball rankings

References

External links
 2018 Phillips 66 Big 12 Conference women's basketball tournament Official Website

Big 12 Conference women's basketball tournament
Tournament
Big 12 Conference women's basketball tournament
Big 12 Conference women's basketball tournament
Basketball competitions in Oklahoma City
Women's sports in Oklahoma
College sports tournaments in Oklahoma